'Batáquez' ,  'Estación Batáquez'  or  'Ejido Monterrey' , is a locality  Mexican of the Valley of Mexicali, in the municipality from Mexicali, Baja California. Despite being a small locality, Batáquez has local importance since it is head of the municipal delegation of the same name.

The name: Batáquez Station is derived from the fact that, from the beginning until the mid-twentieth century, there was a railway station in the town called: Intercalifornias railway or "pachuco train", which was called "Batáquez". Over time, the population center of Ejido Monterrey was located next to the aforementioned station.

Batáquez is communicated mainly by the  federal highway No. 2, which crosses the town from east to west, and by the state highway No. 3, which intersects in this locality with the federal No 2 and heading south, this state highway is the road that connects with  Guadalupe Victoria which is the most important town in the valley area of Mexicali.

History
In 1904 the company Southern Pacific was authorized to build a railway line south of the border to complete the stretch that would connect San Diego with Yuma. This branch entered national territory by Mexicali, then went east, to  Los Algodones, and from there crossed the international line again, until Yuma. This railroad was known as Intercalifornia, but it was popularly called El Chinero, because most of its users through the valley were Chinese, who moved from one ranch to another to work  agricultural and populated the  rural areas in greater numbers than Mexicans.

Along the way, towns were emerging at the railway stations: Pascualitos,  Sesbania, Cucapá, Pólvora,  Hechicera, Batáquez,  Paredones and  Cuervos.

References

External links

Populated places in Baja California
Boroughs of Mexicali